Bertil Johansson may refer to:

Bertil Johansson (1935–2021), Swedish footballer
Bertil Johansson (footballer, born 1902), Swedish footballer, died 1975
Bertil Johansson (footballer, born 1929), Swedish footballer, died 2005
Bertil Johansson (politician) (1930–2018)